Denis Moloney, OBE LLD (Hon.) is a solicitor and notary public from Belfast, Northern Ireland.

Born in Belfast in 1954, he was a member of the Council of State in the Republic of Ireland from 2004-2011.

Moloney is a senior partner in the leading Belfast law firm of Donnelly & Wall specialising in Criminal Law. He was educated at St Malachy's College and Queen's University, Belfast and was conferred with an Honorary Doctorate in Laws from the University of Ulster in 2010.

Appointments

Vice-Chair, St Louise's College, Belfast.
Member, Probation Board for Northern Ireland.
Trustee, Westminster Cathedral, London.
Emeritus Professor of Law, University of Ulster.
Council of State (Ireland). Appointed by President Mary McAleese in 2004.
 Senior Partner, Donnelly & Wall, Solicitors

References 

Lawyers from Belfast
Alumni of Queen's University Belfast
Academics of Ulster University
Solicitors from Northern Ireland
Year of birth missing (living people)
Living people
British notaries
Officers of the Order of the British Empire
Presidential appointees to the Council of State (Ireland)